The steppe-runner (Eremias arguta) is a species of lizard found in Turkey, Romania, Iran, Russia, Azerbaijan, Kazakhstan, Armenia, Uzbekistan, 
Kyrgyzstan, Moldova, Ukraine, Georgia, Tajikistan, Mongolia, and China.

References

Eremias
Reptiles described in 1773
Taxa named by Peter Simon Pallas
Reptiles of Russia